The arrondissement of Basse-Terre is an arrondissement of France in the Guadeloupe department in the Guadeloupe region. It has 18 communes.

Composition

The communes of the arrondissement of Basse-Terre, and their INSEE codes, are:

 Baie-Mahault (97103)
 Baillif (97104)
 Basse-Terre (97105)
 Bouillante (97106)
 Capesterre-Belle-Eau (97107)
 Deshaies (97111)
 Gourbeyre (97109)
 Goyave (97114)
 Lamentin (97115)
 Petit-Bourg (97118)
 Pointe-Noire (97121)
 Saint-Claude (97124)
 Sainte-Rose (97129)
 Terre-de-Bas (97130)
 Terre-de-Haut (97131)
 Trois-Rivières (97132)
 Vieux-Fort (97133)
 Vieux-Habitants (97134)

History

The arrondissement of Basse-Terre was established in 1947. The arrondissement of Saint-Martin-Saint-Barthélemy, containing the communes of Saint-Martin and Saint-Barthélemy, was created in 1963 from part of the arrondissement of Basse-Terre.

As a result of the reorganisation of the cantons of France which came into effect in 2015, the borders of the cantons are no longer related to the borders of the arrondissements. The cantons of the arrondissement of Basse-Terre were, as of January 2015:

 Baie-Mahault
 Basse-Terre-1
 Basse-Terre-2
 Bouillante
 Capesterre-Belle-Eau-1
 Capesterre-Belle-Eau-2
 Gourbeyre
 Goyave
 Lamentin
 Petit-Bourg
 Pointe-Noire
 Saint-Claude
 Sainte-Rose-1
 Sainte-Rose-2
 Les Saintes
 Trois-Rivières
 Vieux-Habitants

References

Basse-Terre
Les Saintes representation into Guadeloupe administration